Enrique García Álvarez (1873–1931) was a Spanish playwright and composer. He wrote over 100 plays, including in collaboration with Pedro Muñoz Seca.

References 

1873 births
1931 deaths
20th-century Spanish dramatists and playwrights